Yosef Hayim (1 September 1835 – 30 August 1909) (Iraqi Hebrew: Yoseph Ḥayyim) was a leading Baghdadi hakham (Sephardi rabbi), authority on halakha (Jewish law), and Master Kabbalist. He is best known as author of the work on halakha Ben Ish Ḥai ("Son of Man (who) Lives"), a collection of the laws of everyday life interspersed with mystical insights and customs, addressed to the masses and arranged by the weekly Torah portion.

Biography
Hayim initially studied in his father's library, and, at the age of 10, he left midrash ("school room") and began to study with his uncle, David Hai Ben Meir, who later founded the Shoshanim LeDavid Yeshiva in Jerusalem. In 1851, he married Rachel, the niece of Abdallah Somekh, his prime mentor, with whom he had a daughter and two sons.

When Hayim was only twenty-five years old, his father died. Despite his youth, the Jews of Baghdad accepted him to fill his father's place as the leading rabbinic scholar of Baghdad, though he never filled the official position of Hakham Bashi. The Sephardic Porat Yosef Yeshiva in Jerusalem, was founded on his advice by Joseph Shalom, of Calcutta, India—one of Hayim's patrons.

Hayim clashed with the reformist Bavarian Jewish scholar Jacob Obermeyer who lived in Baghdad from 1869 to 1880, and excommunicated him. Part of the contention was due to Obermeyer and Hayim's conflicting views on promotion of the Zohar.

Works
The Ben Ish Hai (בן איש חי) is a standard reference in some Sephardi homes (functioning as "a Sephardi Kitzur Shulchan Aruch") and is widely studied in Sephardi yeshivot. Due to the popularity of this book, Hakham Yosef Hayim came to be known as "Ben Ish Hai", by which he is referred to by many today. The book is a collection of homilies he gave over two years discussing the weekly Torah portion. Each chapter begins with a mystical discussion, usually explaining how a Kabbalistic interpretation of a certain verse relates to a particular halakha, and then continuing to expound on that halakha with definitive rulings.

Hakham Yosef Hayim authored over thirty other works, and there are many published Iraqi rite siddurim (prayer books) based on his rulings, which are widely used by Sephardi Jews. Amongst the best known of his works are:

Me-Kabtziel (Miqqabṣiël): an esoteric exposition of Jewish law — which he refers to often in Ben Ish Hai — providing a more detailed explanation of the reasoning underlying certain decisions. It has been speculated that Hakham Yosef Hayim's insistence on having all his works printed in the Land of Israel prevented this essential work from being published.
Ben Yehoyada (Ben Yəhoyadaʻ) and Benayahou: his commentary on the Talmud, considered a basic resource in understanding the Aggada (narrative sections of the Talmud).
The Responsa Rav Pe'alim (Rab Pəʻalim) and Torah Lishmah.
 (reprinted in 1994) 

The names Ben Ish Hai, Me-Kabtziel, Rav Pe'alim and Ben Yehoyada derive from 2 Samuel 23:20.  He chose these names because he claimed to have been a reincarnation of Benayahu ben Yehoyada (described as Ben Ish Hayil, the son of a valiant man); the man in whose merit, it is said, both the first and second Holy Temples stood.

Hakham Yosef Hayim was also noted for his stories and parables. Some are scattered through his halakhic works, but have since been collected and published separately; others were published as separate works in his lifetime, as an alternative to the European-inspired secular literature that was becoming popular at the time. His Qânûn-un-Nisâ (قانون النساء) is a book filled with parables concerning self-improvement. The book, directed towards, but not limited to women, is rare since it was composed in Judeo-Arabic. It was last published in Israel in the 1940s.

See also
Jonatan Meir,  "Toward the Popularization of Kabbalah: R. Yosef Hayyim of Baghdad and the Kabbalists of Jerusalem", Modern Judaism 33(2) (May 2013), pp. 147–172
Kaf HaChaim — a more discursive, and contemporaneous, Sephardi work of Halakha by Rabbi Yaakov Chaim Sofer.
Yalkut Yosef, a contemporary Sephardi work of Halakha, based on the rulings of Rabbi Ovadia Yosef.
Yehuda Fatiyah — a student of Yosef Chaim.
Ben Ish Hai,"   - The Life & Times of Hacham Yosef Haim by Yehuda Azoulay

References

The “Ben Ish Chai” Chacham Yosef Chaim (1834 – 1909), ou.org
Great Jewish Leaders, Eliezer C. Abrahamson
The Ben Ish Chai, tzemachdovid.org
Rabbenu Hakham Ribbi Yoseph Hayyim, benishhai.org
Rabbi Yosef Chaim of Baghdad, torah.net
Benaihu Ben Yehoyada, ascent.org.il

Resources
Ben Ish Chai text (missing the Introduction) (Hebrew), shechem.org
Ben Ish Chai, fulltext, He:Wikisource
Ben Ish Chai portrait by Tiefenbrun
Ben Ish Chai audio lectures (MP3)
Les Fleurs de l'Orient: The Genealogy Site, farhi.org
The Halachot of the Ben Ish Hai, transl. S. Hiley, Philipp Feldheim. 
Golden Apples: Parables Of The Ben Ish Chai , Y. Kahn, Artscroll.

External links

Jonatan Meir "Toward the Popularization of Kabbalah: R. Yosef Hayyim of Baghdad and the Kabbalists of Jerusalem", Modern Judaism 33(2) (May 2013), pp. 147–172

1835 births
1909 deaths
Sephardi Jews from the Ottoman Empire
Rabbis from Baghdad
Jewish mystical texts
Kabbalists
Sephardi rabbis
Writers from Baghdad
19th-century Iraqi rabbis
20th-century Iraqi rabbis
Burials at the Jewish cemetery on the Mount of Olives
Authors of books on Jewish law